Captain Ummed Singh Mahra (21 January 1942–6 July 1971) was a posthumous recipient of the Ashoka Chakra.

Early life

Captain Ummed was born in a Kumaoni Rajput family in Almora, born in the Almora district of Uttarakhand. In 1967 he graduated from the Indian Military Academy and was commissioned a second lieutenant in the 19 battalion of Rajputana Rifles Rajputana Rifles on 11 June. He was promoted lieutenant on 11 June 1969.

Action
In July 1971, as an acting captain, he led a raiding party against the headquarters of an insurgent group in Nagaland. Though wounded in a firefight, he continued to lead the operation which captured a large cache of arms, ammunition and important documents. He died of his wounds after returning from the raid. He was awarded the Ashoka Chakra, India's highest peacetime military decoration.

References

Recipients of the Ashoka Chakra (military decoration)
Military personnel from Uttar Pradesh
1942 births
1971 deaths
Ashoka Chakra